Jack Clayton (1921–1995) was a British film director and producer.

Jack Clayton may also refer to:

Jack Clayton (American football) (1915–1997), American football, basketball, and baseball coach
Jack Clayton (cricketer) (born 1999), Australian cricketer

See also
John Clayton (disambiguation)